Taka is Bangladeshi feature film directed by Shahidul Islam Khokon. The film was released on Eid ul Fitre of 2005. The lead roles are played by Riaz, Purnima, Sohel Rana, Alamgir, Humayun Faridi, Suchorita, and Atikur Rahman Mahi . Child actor Mahi won Best Child actor, National Film awards of Bangladesh for his role.

Cast
 Riaz as Shanto Mirza
 Purnima as Mouli Chowdhury
 Sohel Rana as Rayhan Chowdhury
 Alamgir as Shayakh Mirza
 Suchorita as Mouli's Mother
 Humayun Faridi as Arman Chowdhury
 Ahmed Sharif as Guest appearance

Awards
Atikur Rahman Mahi won Bangladesh National Film Awards as best Child actor.

References

External links
 

Bengali-language Bangladeshi films
2004 films
2000s Bengali-language films
Bangladeshi comedy films